The  Washington Redskins season was the franchise's 15th season in the National Football League (NFL) and their 9th in Washington, D.C. The team failed to improve on their 8–2 record from 1945 and finished 5–5–1.

Schedule

Standings 

Washington
Washington Redskins seasons
Washington